The lions of Industriales won its fifth Cuban National Series, outdistancing Habana and two-time defending champion Azucareros over the 78-game season.

Standings

References

 (Note - text is printed in a white font on a white background, depending on browser used.)

Cuban National Series seasons
Base
Base
1973 in baseball